Xu Zhi (died 254) was a military general of the state of Cao Wei during the Three Kingdoms period of China. He participated in a battle against an invading army from Wei's rival state, Shu Han, led by the Shu general Jiang Wei. His name is sometimes incorrectly romanised as Xu Zi.

Life
In 254, the Wei-appointed official in charge of Didao County defected to Shu and surrendered, after which the Shu troops under Jiang Wei's command entered Wei territory without being challenged until they reached Xiangwu (襄武). There, Xu Zhi organised the local defences to resist the Shu invasion. During the ensuing battle, he defeated the Shu Han generals Liao Hua and Zhang Yi (Bogong) (張翼) and killed Zhang Ni. However, Zhang Ni's desperate fight also inflicted a devastating damage to Xu Zhi's army, so he was forced to retreat and surrounded by Shu forces led by Jiang Wei. He was soon defeated and beheaded. Thus, the Shu army gained some foothold in the Long (隴) region (in present-day Gansu).

In Romance of the Three Kingdoms
In the 14th-century historical novel Romance of the Three Kingdoms, Xu Zhi volunteers to lead the Wei vanguard to engage Jiang Wei in battle. The two armies encounter each other at Dong Village (董亭) and get into their respective formations. Xu Zhi charges out of the Wei formation and duels with the Shu general Liao Hua. Soon after, Liao Hua takes advantage of a feint and retreats. Zhang Yi continues the duel against Xu Zhi but retreats as well after a few rounds. Xu Zhi then leads his troops on a charge and defeats the enemy. Later, Xu Zhi is caught in a surprise attack led by Liao Hua and Zhang Yi. Though his force is wiped out, Xu Zhi manages to escape alive; he ultimately falls into an ambush and meets his end at the hands of Jiang Wei's men.

See also
 Lists of people of the Three Kingdoms

References

 Chen, Shou (3rd century). Records of the Three Kingdoms (Sanguozhi).
 Luo, Guanzhong (14th century). Romance of the Three Kingdoms (Sanguo Yanyi).
 Pei, Songzhi (5th century). Annotations to Records of the Three Kingdoms (Sanguozhi zhu).

Year of birth unknown
254 deaths
Cao Wei generals